Attorney General Wells may refer to:

Dean Wells (politician) (born 1949), Attorney-General of Queensland
Edmund W. Wells (1846–1938), Attorney General of the Territory of Arizona
Horatio Wells (1808–1858), Attorney General of the Territory of Wisconsin
John S. Wells (1803–1860), Attorney General of New Hampshire
Robert William Wells (1795–1864), Attorney General of Missouri

See also
General Wells (disambiguation)